Wilbert Joseph Tauzin II (born June 14, 1943) is an American lobbyist and politician. He was President and CEO of PhRMA, a pharmaceutical company lobby group. Tauzin was also a member of the United States House of Representatives from 1980 to 2005, representing Louisiana's 3rd congressional district.

Personal life
Of Cajun descent, he is a lifelong resident of Chackbay, a small town just outside Thibodaux, Tauzin graduated from Nicholls State University in 1964 with a Bachelor of Arts Degree and earned a J.D. degree from Louisiana State University in 1967. While attending law school, he served as a legislative aide in the Louisiana state Senate.

He is married to Cecile Tauzin and has five children by a previous marriage.

Political career
Tauzin began his elective career in 1972, when he was elected to the Louisiana House of Representatives and served four full terms as a Democrat. In his first term, he served alongside fellow Democrats Dick Guidry and Leonard J. Chabert. In 1979, David C. Treen, the U.S. representative from Louisiana's 3rd congressional district, the first Republican representative from Louisiana since Reconstruction, was elected as the state's first Republican governor in more than a century. Treen resigned his House seat on March 10, 1980. Tauzin won a special election for the seat on May 17 and was sworn into office on May 22, just five months after winning a fifth term in the state house. He won the congressional race by seven points. Tauzin defeated Democratic State Senator Anthony Guarisco Jr., of Morgan City, and another Democrat-turned-Republican, Jim Donelon, of Jefferson Parish. Tauzin then won a full term in November 1980 with 85 percent of the vote against minimal opposition.

For 15 years, Tauzin was one of the more Conservative Democrats in the House of Representatives. Even though he eventually rose to become an assistant majority whip, he felt shut out by some of his more liberal colleagues and sometimes had to ask the Republicans for floor time. When the Democrats lost control of the House after the 1994 elections, Tauzin was one of the cofounders of the House Blue Dog Coalition, a group of moderate-to-conservative Democrats.

In 1987, Tauzin ran for governor of Louisiana but lost to a colleague in the U.S. House, Buddy Roemer, as the incumbent, Edwin Edwards, with a weakened second-place showing, withdrew from a runoff election. Others in the race were Republican U.S. Representative Bob Livingston of the New Orleans suburbs and two other Democrats, former U.S. Representative Speedy Long, and Louisiana Secretary of State James H. "Jim" Brown.

However, on August 8, 1995, Tauzin himself became a Republican and claimed that conservatives were no longer welcome in the Democratic Party. He soon became a deputy majority whip and so was the first representative to have been part of the leadership of both parties in the House. Regardless of party, Tauzin remained popular at home. After 1980, he was re-elected twelve more times without major-party opposition, the first nine of which completely unopposed.

Tauzin served as chairman of the Energy and Commerce Committee from 2001 to February 4, 2004, when he announced that he would not run for a 13th full term. Tauzin, who has five children by his first marriage, backed his son, Billy Tauzin III, as his replacement and even went so far as to appear in ads that were criticized as blurring the lines on which man was actually running for Congress. In spite of his father's support, the younger Tauzin was defeated by 569 votes by a Democrat, Charlie Melancon.

During his tenure, he left his mark on issues ranging from natural gas, airline, trucking, and electricity deregulation to the Clean Air Act, Superfund and the Telecommunications Act of 1996. In addition, he was an original author of the Private Securities Litigation Reform Act and the Cable Act, which went on to become law despite a Presidential veto.

In 2003, he was inducted into the Louisiana Political Museum and Hall of Fame in Winnfield.

Lobbyist
In January 2005, the day after his term in Congress ended, he began work as the head of the Pharmaceutical Research and Manufacturers of America (PhRMA). a powerful trade group for pharmaceutical companies. Tauzin was hired at a salary outsiders estimated at $2 million a year. Five years later, he announced his retirement from the association (as of the end of June 2010).

Two months before resigning as chair of the U.S. House Committee on Energy and Commerce, which oversees the drug industry, Tauzin had played a key role in shepherding through Congress the Medicare Prescription Drug Bill. Democrats said that the bill was "a give-away to the drugmakers" because it prohibited the government from negotiating lower drug prices and bans the importation of identical cheaper drugs from Canada and elsewhere.

The Veterans Affairs agency, which can negotiate drug prices, pays much less than Medicare. The bill was passed in an unusual congressional session at 3 a.m. under heavy pressure from the drug companies.

As head of PhRMA, Tauzin was a key figure in 2009 health care reform negotiations that produced pharmaceutical industry support for White House and Senate efforts.

Tauzin received $11.6 million from PhRMA in 2010, making him the highest-paid health law lobbyist. Since 2005, Tauzin has been on the Board of Directors at LHC Group.

Controversies

Jerome Schneider
Tauzin endorsed Jerome Schneider's book The Complete Guide to Offshore Money Havens by dubbing the book, "A serious contender for the best book on offshore banking I've ever seen." Tauzin also spoke at one of Schneider's tax conferences. After Schneider pleaded guilty in 2004 to assisting hundreds of people to avoid taxes through sham offshore banks, a spokesperson for Tauzin called his endorsement "a stupid mistake."

Connections to pharmaceutical industry
In his capacity as chair of the House Committee on Energy and Commerce, Tauzin "was one of the chief architects of the Medicare bill." Tauzin's appointment shortly afterward (The day after retiring from Congress) as chief lobbyist for the Pharmaceutical Research and Manufacturers of America (PhRMA), the trade association and lobby group for the drug industry, drew criticism from the consumer advocacy group Public Citizen, which claimed that Tauzin "may have been negotiating for the lobbying job while writing the Medicare legislation."

See also
 List of American politicians who switched parties in office
 List of United States representatives who switched parties

References

External links
 Marcia Angell. "High cost for me-too drug", boston.com, February 12, 2007
 "Under The Influence 60 Minutes' Steve Kroft Reports On Drug Lobbyists' Role in Passing Bill That Keeps Drug Prices High", cbsnews.com, April 1, 2007
Entry in the Congressional Biographical Dictionary, bioguide.congress.gov

1943 births
Living people
Louisiana state senators
Members of the Louisiana House of Representatives
American lobbyists
Louisiana State University Law Center alumni
Nicholls State University alumni
People from Thibodaux, Louisiana
American people of French descent
Cajun people
Louisiana Republicans
American nonprofit executives
Republican Party members of the United States House of Representatives
Democratic Party members of the United States House of Representatives from Louisiana
21st-century American politicians
Members of Congress who became lobbyists